Crystal Kelly (born September 15, 1986) is a professional basketball player who played in the Women's National Basketball Association (WNBA).

High school
Kelly played for Sacred Heart Academy in Louisville, Kentucky, where she was named a WBCA All-American. In addition, Kelly was named the 2004 Kentucky Miss Basketball.  She participated in the 2004 WBCA High School All-America Game where she scored four points.

College
Kelly attended college at Western Kentucky University, where she was a standout basketball player.  She broke the WKU women's basketball program record for career rebounds, and earned a place in the top 25 career scorers in NCAA Division I women's basketball history by scoring over 2,600 points.  In her senior year, she led the nation with a 64.8% field goal shooting percentage. Kelly was named to the all-Sun Belt Conference team during each of her four collegiate seasons, and was named the 2008 Sun Belt Player of the Year in her senior season.  She graduated with a bachelor's degree in public relations in 2008.

Western Kentucky statistics

Source

Professional
Following her collegiate career, Kelly was selected in the third round (31st overall) in the 2008 WNBA Draft by the Houston Comets. The Comets waived Kelly in May 2008, but a few days later she was signed to the Sacramento Monarchs.

Kelly averaged 7 points per game in 16 minutes per game as a backup to starting forward Rebekkah Brunson during the 2008 regular season.  Then an injury to Brunson allowed Kelly to become a starter and a notable scorer during the WNBA Playoffs.  In the Monarchs' victory over the San Antonio Silver Stars in Game 2 of the Western Conference semifinals, Kelly led all scorers with 19 points.

Following her WNBA career, Kelly was hired as an assistant coach for the Women's Basketball team at Tennessee Tech, then later at Bellarmine University. Following these five years of coaching, Kelly was hired as Xavier University's Women's Basketball Assistant Coach.

Notes

See also
 List of NCAA Division I women's basketball players with 2,500 points and 1,000 rebounds

External links
WNBA Player Profile

1986 births
Living people
American women's basketball players
Basketball players from Louisville, Kentucky
Detroit Shock players
Sacramento Monarchs players
San Antonio Stars players
Western Kentucky Lady Toppers basketball players
Forwards (basketball)